The 1925–26 NCAA men's basketball season began in December 1925, progressed through the regular season and conference tournaments, and concluded in March 1926.

Season headlines 

 In February 1943, the Helms Athletic Foundation retroactively selected Syracuse as its national champion for the 1925–26 season.
 In 1995, the Premo-Porretta Power Poll retroactively selected Syracuse as its national champion for the 1925–26 season.

Conference membership changes

Regular season

Conference winners and tournaments

Statistical leaders

Awards

Helms College Basketball All-Americans 

The practice of selecting a Consensus All-American Team did not begin until the 1928–29 season. The Helms Athletic Foundation later retroactively selected a list of All-Americans for the 1925–26 season.

Major player of the year awards 

 Helms Player of the Year: Jack Cobb, North Carolina (retroactive selection in 1944)

Coaching changes

References